Meherzan Mazda is an Indian film and television actor.

Career
Mazda started off with MTV India's reality show Splitsvilla 2. He made his television acting debut with the show Seven as Mastishk on Sony TV. He gained popularity in 2014 as Umesh Gangwal in Star Plus's Nisha Aur Uske Cousins. After that he was a part of shows like Dhhai Kilo Prem, Khottey Sikkey also works in campus dairies

He also worked in Luv Ka The End as one of the main protagonists. He will be seen in the movie Basthi Hai Sasthi as Sukhshinder Moidutty. In 2018, he was seen in Kaisi Yeh Yaariyaan 3 as Smaran Hehbar. From 2018 to 2019, he portrayed Mahabbat in Colors TV's Dastaan-E-Mohabbat: Salim Anarkali.

Filmography

Television

Film

Web series

References

External links

Indian male television actors
Indian male soap opera actors
Participants in Indian reality television series